A retriever is a dog that returns game to a hunter. The word may also refer to:
 Retriever (album), 2004 album by Ron Sexsmith
 Retriever Communications, a mobile communications company
 Retriever Activities Center, an arena on the campus of the University of Maryland, Baltimore County
 Retriever (Dungeons & Dragons), the Construct of Dungeons and Dragons
 Retriever, a Lycos information summarization product
, a British R-class destroyer launched in 1917
 MV Retriever, a NASA vessel
 UMBC Retrievers, the athletic program of the University of Maryland, Baltimore County